Ag Gonbad (also Romanized as Āq Gonbad and Āqgonbad; also known as Agh Gonbad, Bandar Aq Gunbad, Bandar-e Āgh Gonbad, Bandar-e Āq Gonbad, Bandar-e Sefīd Gonbad, Bandar Safīd Gunbad, Bandar Sefid Gunbad, Gumbad, Sefīd Gonbad, and Sefid Gunbad) is a village in Jazireh Rural District, Ilkhchi District, Osku County, East Azerbaijan Province, Iran. At the 2006 census, its population was 898, in 267 families.

References 

Populated places in Osku County